The 63rd United States Colored Infantry Regiment was a U.S.C.T. infantry regiment in the Union Army during the American Civil War. It was reformed from the 9th Louisiana Infantry (African Descent) (which continued to exist as 5th U.S. Colored Heavy Artillery) in March 1864 and served, commanded by Colonel John Eaton, in various garrison posts in Mississippi. It was mustered out on January 9, 1866.

See also
List of United States Colored Troops Civil War units

Sources
Civil War Archive

United States Colored Troops Civil War units and formations
Military units and formations established in 1864
1864 establishments in Louisiana
Military units and formations disestablished in 1866